Sigfred Johansen (31 May 1908 – 18 July 1953), was a Danish film actor of the 1930s and 1940s.

Filmography
Odds 777 (1932)
De blaa drenge (1933)
Nyhavn 17 (1933)
De bør forelske Dem (1935)
Bag Københavns kulisser (1935)
Week-end (1935)
Giftes-nej tak (1936)
Flådens blå matroser (1937)
Inkognito (1937)
I dag begynder livet (1939)
Pas på svinget i Solby (1940)
Familien Olsen (1940)
En pige med pep (1940)
Tag det som en mand (1941)
Tak fordi du kom Nick (1941)
Tante Cramers testamente (1942)
Alt for karrieren (1943)
Oktoberroser (1946)
Hans store aften (1946)
Jenny and the Soldier (1947)
Hr. Petit (1948)

External links

1908 births
1953 deaths
Danish male film actors
Danish male actors
People from Frederiksberg
20th-century Danish male actors
1953 suicides